This is a list of women writers who were born in Pakistan or whose writings are closely associated with that country.

A 
Umera Ahmad (born 1976), short story writer, novelist, playwright, author of Pir-e-Kamil
Annie Ali Khan (1980 – 21 July 2018), Pakistani writer and journalist
Shaila Abdullah (born 1971), Pakistani-American short story writer, novelist
Ishrat Afreen (born 1956), Pakistani-American poet, women's rights activist, educator
Moniza Alvi (born 1954), Pakistani-British poet
Altaf Fatima (1927–2018), Pakistani novelist
Afzal Tauseef (May 18 1936 – December 30 2014), writer, columnist and journalist

B
Fatima Surayya Bajia (1930–2016), novelist, playwright
Bano Qudsia (1928-2017) Novelist, Playwriter
Fatima Bhutto (born 1982), poet, memorist, novelist
Shahbano Bilgrami (born 1973), poet, novelist, editor
Razia Butt (1924–2012), novelist, autobiographer

C 
 Zeenat Abdullah Channa, (1919–1974), Short story writer, essayist

D
Tehmina Durrani (born 1953), autobiographical novelist, author of the widely translated My Feudal Lord

F
Bushra Farrukh (born 1957), poet
Samira Fazal (born 1976), playwright, screenwriter

H
Yasmeen Hameed, since 1988, poet, educator
Zaib-un-Nissa Hamidullah (1921–2000), Indian-born Pakistani journalist, columnist, non-fiction writer, women's rights activist
Shahida Hassan, since the mid-1990s, poet
Zahida Hina, since 1962, essayist, journalist, columnist, short story writer, novelist
Shahrukh Husain (born 1950), novelist, non-fiction writer, living in London
Fahmida Hussain (born 1948), literary scholar, non-fiction writer

I
Shaista Suhrawardy Ikramullah (1915–2000), politician, essayist, autobiographer
Saba Imtiaz, journalist, author, screenwriter
Farhat Ishtiaq (born 1980), novelist, screenwriter, author of Humsafar

J
Ayesha Jalal, Pakistani-American educator, historian, since 1990: non-fiction writer

K
Manmeet Kaur (fl 2000s), Sikh journalist
Uzma Aslam Khan (born 1969), Pakistani novelist 
Rukhsana Khan (born 1962), Pakistani-Canadian children's writer
Maki Kureishi (1927–1995), poet

L
Yasmeen Lari (born c.1941), architect, non-fiction writer

M
 Muniba Mazari
 Shazia Mirza (British Comedian and Writer)  Columnist for The Guardian

N
Asma Nabeel (fl 2000s), screenwriter, poet
Kishwar Naheed (born 1940), poet, feminist
 Badam Natawan, (1924–1988), novelist, prose writer
Sarwat Nazir, contemporary novelist, playwright, screenwriter, author of Main Abdul Qadir Hoon (2010)
Amina Nazli (1914–1996), writer, editor, feminist
Zehra Nigah, since 1950s, poet, screenwriter

R 
Bushra Rahman (1944–2022), politician, novelist
Samina Raja (1961–2012), poet, translator, educator
Fahmida Riaz (1946–2018), poet, translator, feminist

S
Afia Salam (fl 1980s), journalist
Sehba Sarwar, contemporary novelist, short story writer, author of Black Wings (2004)
Sara Shagufta (died 1984), poet
Bina Shah, since 2001, short story writer, novelist, columnist
Qaisra Shahraz, since 2001, novelist, short story writer, living in Britain 
Parveen Shakir (1952–1994), poet, educator
Kamila Shamsie (born 1973), English-language novelist
Muneeza Shamsie, essayist, anthologist, literary writer
Bapsi Sidhwa (born 1938), English-language novelist, living in the United States
 Noorul Huda Shah (born 1957), playwright, novelist, Short story writer and Dramatist
 Salma Shaheen (born 1954), poet, writer, researcher and novelist

T 
 Naseem Thebo, (1948–2012), story writer

Y
Malala Yousafzai (born 1997), Nobel Peace Prize winner, female education activist, memoirist

Z 
 Sumaira Zareen (1944–1977), story writer
 Zaitoon Bano (18 June 1938 — 14 September 2021), fiction writer, poet

See also
List of women writers

References

-
Pakistani
Writers
Women